Union Theological Seminary is the oldest Protestant seminary in the Philippines. It was Established in 1907 when the Ellinwood Bible Training School (founded by the Presbyterians in 1905) and the Florence B. Nicholson Bible Seminary (established by the Methodists in 1905) merged into one theological institution .  The fusion of these two institutions was a significant event for The Comity Agreement, which intended to unify various mainline Protestant denominations established by American missionaries during American Colonial Era of the Philippines. Though the United Church of Christ in the Philippines and the United Methodist Church in the Philippines collectively support it, the seminary is independent of both in structure and curricular formation.

Since its creation, the seminary has produced pastors and church workers who contributed substantially to Protestantism in the Philippines.  Graduates of the seminary went to work for well-established local churches. Its alumni played a vital role in the creation of the United Church of Christ in the Philippines in 1948. Through the leadership and dedication to ecumenical ministries, individuals who came from UTS took part in the formation of the Association of Theological Education in Southeast Asia in 1957 and the National Council of Churches in the Philippines in 1963.

History

When various Protestant denominations from America came to the Philippines in the early 1900s, the missionaries started teaching Filipinos about the Bible and basic doctrines of Christianity. These trained clergy played, and continue to play, an active role in the spread of Protestant influence throughout the islands. Bible study courses were conducted in churches and homes until Protestant churches started to make their own theological institutions. On August 25, 1903, the Manila Bible Institute was initiated and has become an annual event to train church workers within a course of one month. Numerous pastors from Manila and Dagupan attended the training. Since then, various Bible schools were established and theological education among Protestants in the Philippines has become more institutionalized not only in Manila, but in other provinces as well.

Ellinwood Bible School
With the help of James B. Rodgers and other missionaries, the Presbyterian Mission has established churches in Manila and nearby provinces. One of the most prominent churches is the Ellinwood Malate Church, which was named after Francis F. Ellinwood, the Secretary General of the Presbyterian Mission Board during that time.  Rodgers had envisioned a school in Manila and after a few years, the church founded Ellinwood Bible School in 1905. The school taught basic instruction on the Bible, preaching, health, and good manners. The Bible school had separate classes for boys and girls. The buildings of the Bible school were erected in 1906: one for the young men and one for the young women. Dormitories were also built as part of the expansion under the direction of George W. Wright.

Florence B. Nicholson Seminary
The Methodist Episcopal Mission instituted the Florence B. Nicholson Bible Seminary on October 11, 1905, in Manila.  The president of the seminary was Harry Farmer. In 1906, another seminary was established in Dagupan, Pangasinan. The following year, the classes in Dagupan were transferred to Manila after the church acquired a property in Caloocan (which was then part of Rizal). Students from the provinces transferred and continued their studies in Manila.  On December 4, 1908, the first batch of students graduated from a three-year course.

The Union
With the shared vision of uniting various Protestant traditions, the Presbyterian and the Methodist Missions combined efforts to hold Bible classes for workers in 1905. Under the direction of Wright and Farmer, the sessions were successful and became a regular event in the community. In early 1907, the leadership of the Ellinwood Bible School and the Florence Nicholson Seminary came up with an idea for the possible establishment of a united theological institution that would jointly train church workers from these two Protestant traditions. 

Following a conference held by the two churches, this vision became a reality; giving birth to the Union Bible Seminary. The first classes of this joint theological seminary began in June 1907 in the Ellinwood building in Malate. In following years, classes were also held in Caloocan. The division of the classes into two different locations was found to be inconvenient, resulting in the decision to hold the sessions in the Ellinwood buildings and the Central Methodist Church. The union was based on mutual cooperation and the strength of the established bond led to a general sharing of everything from the faculty to the properties. In succeeding years, more denominations joined the union, adding their students to the expanding seminary. The United Brethren joined the cooperative effort in 1911, the Disciples of Christ in 1916, and the Congregationalists in 1919. In 1920, Union Theological Seminary was adopted as official name of the institution. In 1921, the corporation was formed having its own Constitution and By-Laws. The newly incorporated seminary did not have facilities of its own in its early years, until a new building was erected at the corner of Taft Avenue and Herran Street (now Pedro Gil). It was dedicated in 1926. During World War II, the seminary temporarily suspended classes and resumed after the war had ended. In the bombing of Manila in 1945, the city was severely devastated. Many of the historic buildings and landmarks were ruined, but UTS building remained intact and still stands today. The seminary stood on Taft Avenue in Manila from 1926 to 1962. 

During the special meeting of the Board of Trustees on June 2, 1961, held in Baguio, it was approved that the seminary be assigned to a new location.  The Board of Founders of the Nanking Theological Seminary provided the funds needed to buy a property. There were two options at that time. First was to acquire the 5-hectare property at the University of the Philippines in Diliman, which would substantiate the seminary's relationship with the university (which was also founded by the Presbyterians). The second option was to purchase a property in a nearby province south of Manila. The latter choice was more appealing, the site being an ideal property to establish the new UTS community while creating opportunities for expansion of its ministries in the rural areas.  In June 1962, the seminary moved to Dasmariñas, Cavite. Development begun on the 97-hectare property before the transfer with the dormitories, classrooms, library and refectory already in progress at that time of the move. Housing projects for the faculty were also initiated. The seminary continues to stand in this spot today.

While the seminary was still in its original location, a Union High School was established in Manila by the Evangelical Union in 1919. Later on, the Union Christian College in San Fernando, La Union, was founded in 1936 with elementary and college departments. The seminary began offering college courses in Manila, which eventually led to the birth of Manila Union University in 1947. This institution became the Philippine Christian College. The schools were all created by the seminary leadership to serve the educational needs of pastors, their families, and the surrounding communities. For many years, the seminary and the colleges existed independently and cooperatively under separate boards. Most of the facilities in Manila had been shared with the Philippine Christian College until the seminary moved to its new location in Dasmariñas, Cavite. Since then, the seminary has occupied a small portion of the building along Taft Avenue, mostly for administrative and academic functions for post-graduate studies. The Philippine Christian College attained its university status in 1976. The College of Agriculture was then offered in its Dasmariñas, where the Union Theological Seminary was situated. In 1978, Union Theological Seminary merged with Philippine Christian University to create Philippine Christian Center of Learning.

This seminary has been involved in various movements for the protection of human rights. Upon the request of the bishops of the UCCP and United Methodist Church in the Philippines in early 2001, the institution willingly accepted and granted shelter to several families of Mangyans from Mindoro who had left their homes due to massive military operations in their localities. The seminary has proclaimed its vicinity as a kanlungan ("refuge" in Filipino) and served as a sanctuary to the victims of forced displacement and oppression.

Theological Formation

The Critical Asian Principle
Since 1972, the Union Theological Seminary in partnership with member seminaries and divinity schools of the ATESEA, has adopted the Critical Asian Principle as the basis of perspective for implementing the operation of various theological programs of the member schools. The CAP celebrates and emphasizes the Asian experience as theological education's situational, hermeneutical, missiological and pedagogical principle. These four key principles were conceptualized to empower Asian churches develop theologies of their own that are fully liberated from the culturally extraneous framework and evolve values that privilege Asian thought, reflection, and action in their actual theologies.

 
It includes the following concerns: 
 Religious Fundamentalisms
 Gender Justice
 Ecological Problems, Disease and Disasters
 Globalization and Global Empire Building
 Colonization
 Spirituality
 Identity and Power Struggle
 Peoples Movements and Ecumenism
 Information Technology – Change and Challenges
 Social Challenges, Indigenous Identity and Minority Rights

The Centennial Curriculum
Considering recommendations from the World Alliance of Reformed Churches and adopting the Revised Critical Asian Principle, the seminary has devised the Centennial Curriculum to make the education contextual, holistic and responsive to current challenges and experiences of the people to become more relevant in the Philippine situation. The primary language used in the instruction is Filipino, but English is alternatively used to facilitate communication with international students.

Degrees

UTS confers various types of programs: (1) residential program: both graduate (M.Div.) and undergraduate (B.Th.); (2) Theological education by extension: Master of Ministry (M. Min.) and Bachelor of Ministry (B. Min.) and Doctorate in ministry (D. Min.);and, (3) graduate programs: M. Theol. and D. Theol. (being offered in cooperation with the ATESEA Theological Union). Currently, there are six centers for theological studies:
 Center for Peace and Justice
 Center for Arts, Liturgy and Music
 Center for Geocentric Applied Theology
 Center for Pastoral and Spiritual Formation
 Center for Ecumenics and Mission
 Center for Women, Youth, and Children.

Notable alumni
Among the best people who have attended Union Theological Seminary are the following:
 Dionisio D. Alejandro (1893-1972), (B.D. 1922) first Filipino bishop of the United Methodist Church (elected in 1944)Cecilia lorenzana
 Benjamin I. Guansing, (1908-1968), first Filipino president of UTS (1952-1966), one of the founders and first Chairperson of ATESEA, bishop of UMC (elected in 1967)
 Cirilo A. Rigos (B.Th.,1955), former General Secretary of UCCP (1968-1972), appointed as delegate to the Philippine Constitutional Commission, former President of the Philippine Bible Society, former Executive Secretary of UBS, ordained minister of UCCP
 La Verne D. Mercado (B.Th.,1952), hailed as one of the heroes of the struggle against dictatorship in the Philippines, former General Secretary of NCCP (1974-1987), bishop of UMC (elected in 1976)
 Feliciano V. Cariño, former General Secretary of WSCF, former General Secretary of CCA (1995-2000), former General Secretary of NCCP (1988-1995), organizing secretary and former Chairperson of Student Christian Movement of the Philippines
 Emerito P. Nacpil, President of UTS (1971-1975), former executive director of ATESEA, served in Central Committee of WCC, bishop of UMC (elected in 1980)
 Daniel C. Arichea Jr. (B.Th.,1957), translation consultant UBS, former President of Philippine Bible Society, former Chairperson of NCCP, bishop of UMC (elected in 1994)
 Cipriano S. Navarro, bishop of UCCP (elected 1948), one of the founding leaders of the UCCP and Philippine Methodist Church
 Leonardo G. Dia, bishop of UCCP (elected 1948), one of the founding leaders of the UCCP
 Proculo A. Rodriguez, bishop of UCCP (elected 1948), one of the founding leaders of the UCCP
 Ciriaco Ma. Lagunzad, former General Secretary of NCCP (1972-1973)
 Marciano C. Evangelista, bishop of UCCP (elected 1960)
 Eligio B.A. Hernandez, bishop of UCCP (elected 1972)
 Eduardo B. Panganiban, bishop of UCCP (elected 1974)
 Estanislao Q. Abainza, (A.Th.,1949; B.Th.,1952; BD,1959) former General Secretary of UCCP (1972-1976), bishop of UCCP 
 Erme R. Camba, (honoris causa in 2014) former General Secretary of UCCP (1986-1994), bishop of UCCP
 Hilario M. Gomez Jr., former General Secretary of UCCP (1994-1998), bishop of UCCP 
 Elmer M. Bolocon, (B.Th.1974) former General Secretary of UCCP (1998-2006), bishop of UCCP (elected in 1998)
 Eliezer M. Pascua, former General Secretary of UCCP (2006-2010), bishop of UCCP (elected in 1990)
 Cornelio M. Ferrer, bishop of UMC (elected in 1968)
 Paul Locke A. Granadosin, bishop of UMC (elected in 1968)
 Juan A. Marigza, (B.Th.,1957) bishop of UCCP (elected in 1986)
 Gabriel A. Garol, bishop of UCCP (elected in 1994)
 Nelinda Primavera - Briones, first woman bishop in the Philippines / UCCP (elected in 1998)
 Benjamin A. Justo, (BD,1968) bishop of UMC (elected in 2000)
 Leo A. Soriano, (BD, 1980) bishop of UMC (elected in 2000)
 Solito K. Toquero, (BD,1973) bishop of UMC (elected in 2001)
 Jose D. Dalino (D.Min 1992) bishop of CAMACOP (elected 2001 & 2013)
 Benjamin G. Barloso, (BD, 1981) bishop of UCCP (elected 2002)
 Dulce Pia Rose, second woman bishop in the Philippines / UCCP (elected in 2006)
 Jesse S. Suarez, bishop of UCCP (elected in 2006)
 Rodolfo A. Juan, bishop of UMC (elected in 2008)
 Lito C. Tangonan, presiding bishop and founder of Ang Iglesia Metodista sa Pilipinas (2012), former bishop of UMC (elected in 2008)
 Arturo R. Asi, (B.Th.,1979) bishop of UCCP (elected in 2010)
 Roel P. Mendoza, bishop of UCCP (elected in 2010)
 Jaime R. Moriles, bishop of UCCP (elected in 2010)
 Pedro E. Torio Jr., bishop of UMC (elected in 2012)
 Ciriaco Q. Francisco, bishop of UMC (elected in 2012)
 Emergencio D. Padillo, bishop of UCCP (elected in 2014)
 Joel E. Tendero, bishop of UCCP (elected in 2014)Cecilia lorenzana

See also
 UCCP Seminaries and Affiliated Institutions
 Association for Theological Education in Southeast Asia
 Southeast Asia Graduate School of Theology
 Philippine Christian University
 Protestantism in the Philippines

References

External links

  Union Theological Seminary Philippines website
 World Council of Churches website
 United Church of Christ in the Philippines website
 Philippine Christian University website

Education in Dasmariñas
Educational institutions established in 1907
Religion in Cavite
1907 establishments in the Philippines